August Paul Herman "Pete" Herchenratter (August 10, 1919 – December 7, 2017) was a Canadian professional ice hockey player who played for the Springfield Indians, New Haven Eagles, Providence Reds, Philadelphia Rockets, Hershey Bears, Cleveland Barons and Washington Lions in the American Hockey League. In 2014, Herchenratter was nominated for and received the French Legion d'Honneur for his military service during World War II. He was the brother of Art Herchenratter. He died in December 2017 at the age of 98.

References

External links
 

1919 births
2017 deaths
Canadian ice hockey right wingers
Cleveland Barons (1937–1973) players
Hershey Bears players
Ice hockey people from Ontario
Recipients of the Legion of Honour
New Haven Ramblers players
Philadelphia Rockets players
Sportspeople from Kitchener, Ontario
Springfield Indians players
Washington Lions players
Canadian expatriates in the United States